Za'faran may refer to:
 Zəfəran, village in Baku, Azerbaijan
 Mor Hananyo Monastery, known as the Za'faran, or Saffron Monastery, in southeastern Turkey
 Zafaran, Kermanshah, village in Kermanshah Province, Iran
 Zafaran-e Olya, village in Kermanshah Province, Iran
 Zafaran-e Sofla, village in Kermanshah Province, Iran
 Zafaran, Qazvin, village in Qazvin Province, Iran

See also
 Zafaran (disambiguation)
 Saffron (disambiguation)